Helmond (called Héllemond in the local dialect) is a city and municipality in the Metropoolregio Eindhoven of the province of North Brabant in the Southern Netherlands.

Helmond is home to several textile and metal companies. The Vlisco factory is located next to the Zuid-Willemsvaart canal, which runs through the city.

The spoken language is Helmonds (an East Brabantian dialect).

History

Etymology and Coat of Arms 
Helmond's coat of arms, first appearing in 1241, displays a helmet, and is a canting arms for the city's name, as helm means helmet in Dutch. However, the actual etymology of Helmond's name is probably derived from the combination of Hel, which means "low-lying" (from Proto-Germanic *haljæ / Hel), and Mond, which referred to higher ground or a secure place.

The helmet on the coat of arms originally was depicted as a medieval great helm, however, the design eventually came to depict a jousting helmet. The oak sprigs symbolize freedom, while the bird perched on them is thought to be purely decorative.

Medieval and Early Modern Periods 
During the Merovingian period, the site of what is now Helmond was an only partially habitable convergence of streams. As the streams began to silt over, settlement was made possible, and by the year 1000, a settlement arose west of what is the current city center. Additionally, a precursor to the current Helmond Castle, named 't Oude Huys ("the old house"), was built around this time. Documents from 1108 mention Lord Hazelo von Helmond, the first feudal lord of the allodium of Helmond.

In 1179, a bull of Pope Alexander III mentions Helmond being donated to the Abbey of Floreffe. At this point, the local feudal administration was probably moved to t' Oude Huys. In 1220, Helmond came under the control of Henry I of Brabant. In 1225, the town was founded by Henry, it received its Town Privileges in 1232. Following his death in 1235, it was passed down to his daughter, Maria of Brabant, Holy Roman Empress, who spent much time at t' Oude Huys and whose founding of Binderen Abbey benefited the growth of the city. Upon her death in 1260, the town passed back to the Dukes of Brabant, who, in 1315, leased it to the van Berlaer family. In 1325, Jan II Berthout van Berlaer started the construction of a stone keep on the site of the current Helmond Castle, supplanting t' Oude Huys. By 1400, the city ramparts were built.

Having gained market rights in 1376, Helmond's textile industry began to develop, and in 1389, seven guilds were authorized to operate in the town. Merchants from Helmond sold wool and textiles throughout Brabant. Despite the commercial growth, the town's population remained small. Helmond's prosperity soon ended due to war and instability in the Duchy of Guelders, and following Charles V's ascension to the Duchy of Brabant, Helmond was put under siege and sacked by the army of Maarten van Rossum in 1543.

Under the Dutch Republic and the Revolutionary era 
Helmond was also embroiled in the Eighty Years War. Since it remained loyal to Philip II of Spain, the army of the Dutch Republic twice captured and lost the city, with only the castle remaining uncaptured. The effects of the war and a plague outbreak in 1636 decimated the textile industry in Helmond, and many weavers fled to Haarlem. Only with the peace of 1648 could the city start to recover. The weavers of Helmond gained a fruitful partnership with merchants in Haarlem, and the city could rebuild from the war. Catholics were pushed underground. Although the city recovered its prosperity, it was once again plunged into instability during the Patriottentijd of the late 18th century. Following several skirmishes and political maneuvers in the city, the Patriots were crushed through the intervention of Prussia in 1787, but only five years later in 1793, the French Republic invaded. The liberal French administration allowed the Patriots to re-assert themselves in the city, and in 1795, universal male suffrage came to Helmond. By 1798, the vestiges of the Dutch Republic were abolished, and Catholics were once again allowed to take part in city governance.

19th and 20th centuries 
By the late 18th and early 19th century, local entrepreneurs also started to grow the textile business unassisted by the Haarlem merchants, facilitating industrial production. It became a city with a seat in the Estates of Brabant in 1814. The 1826 opening of the Zuid-Willemsvaart canal, which runs through the city, brought more prosperity to the city. In addition to the weaving mills and the associated yarn dyeing and bleaching plants, other branches of the textile industry also developed, such as cotton printing. 

The introduction of steam power and construction of a railway station in 1866 greatly accelerated the development of Helmond, and its population greatly increased. By the early 20th century, industry in Helmond started to branch out from textiles: metal products, such as machines and wires, were produced in the city, along with a cocoa factory, a margarine factory, and the grocery chain EDAH.

In 1940, Helmond was captured by the Wehrmacht, and its city administration was taken over by NSB collaborators. The city was liberated by the British Army on 24 and 25 September 1944.

After the war, industry once again flourished, with new companies establishing themselves in the city while old industries continued. Pursuing a modern image, prominent projects such as the Cube Houses were built. Helmond gained its 80,000th resident in 1999, and continues to grow.

Geography 
Helmond is subdivided into quarters and neighbourhoods:

Quarter 11 Inner City
Neighbourhood 0	Centrum
Neighbourhood 2	Leonardus
Neighbourhood 3	Heipoort
Neighbourhood 4	Stationsgebied
Neighbourhood 5	Vossenberg
Neighbourhood 6	Annabuurt en Suytkade
Neighbourhood 7	Steenweg en omgeving
Quarter 11 Helmond-East
Neighbourhood 0	Beisterveld
Neighbourhood 1	Beisterveldse Broek
Neighbourhood 2	Straakven
Quarter 12 Helmond-North
Neighbourhood 0	Bloemvelden
Neighbourhood 1	Binderen
Neighbourhood 2	Eeuwsels
Quarter 13 Mierlo-Hout
Neighbourhood 0	't Hout-Centrum
Neighbourhood 1	Kroon
Neighbourhood 2	Akkers
Neighbourhood 3	Gansenwinkel
Neighbourhood 9	Groot Goor
Quarter 14 Brouwhuis
Neighbourhood 0	Brouwhuis-Dorp
Neighbourhood 1	Brouwhuis-West
Neighbourhood 2	Brouwhuis-Oost
Neighbourhood 4	Brouwhorst
Neighbourhood 9	Kloostereind
Quarter 15 Helmond-West
Neighbourhood 0	West
Neighbourhood 1	Houtsdonk
Quarter 16 Warande
Neighbourhood 0	Oranjebuurt
Neighbourhood 1	Zwanenbeemd
Neighbourhood 9	Overbrug
Quarter 17 Stiphout
Neighbourhood 0	Stiphout-Dorp
Neighbourhood 1	Schooten
Neighbourhood 9	Geeneind
Quarter 18 Rijpelberg
Neighbourhood 1	Rijpelberg-Oost
Neighbourhood 2	Rijpelberg-West
Neighbourhood 9	Berkendonk
Quarter 19 Dierdonk
Neighbourhood 0	Kern Dierdonk
Neighbourhood 9	Scheepstal
Quarter 21 Brandevoort
Neighbourhood 1	De Veste
Neighbourhood 2	Schutsboom
Neighbourhood 3	Stepekolk
Neighbourhood 4	Berenbroek
Quarter 29 Industrial park-South
Neighbourhood 1	Hoogeind
Neighbourhood 2	B.Z.O.B.

Transport 
Railway stations: Helmond, Helmond Brouwhuis, Helmond Brandevoort, Helmond 't Hout

Local media 
Newspapers:
 ED - Helmond Plus
 ZondagNieuws (translated: SundayNews)
 De Traverse
 De Loop
Radio:
 Omroep Helmond (Radio) (translated: Helmond Broadcasting (Radio))
 Internetradio Helmond Sport
Television:
 Omroep Helmond (TV) (translated: Helmond Broadcasting (TV))
News on the internet:
 Alles Over Helmond (part of Omroep Helmond) (translated: Everything About Helmond)
 De Weblog van Helmond (translated: Helmonds´ weblog)

Politics

Municipal council 
The municipal council consists of 37 seats. Below the council since 1998:

The political parties SDH-OH, Helmondse Belangen, and D66 form 1 parliamentary group in the council, but took part in the elections separately. In the elections they received 4, 2 and 2 seats respectively.
The party 50Plus was known as senioren until the elections of 2018

Notable residents 

 Lucas Gassel (ca.1490-ca.1570) Flemish Renaissance painter of landscapes
 Anthonius Konings (1821-1884) a Redemptorist professor and theological writer 
 Theodorus Willem van Lidth de Jeude (1853–1937) a Dutch zoologist and herpetologist
 Matthijs Vermeulen (1888–1967) a Dutch composer and music journalist
 Willem Zeylmans van Emmichoven (1893-1961) a Dutch psychiatrist and anthroposophist
 Franz Jozef Van Beeck (1930-2011) a Dutch priest, author and Christian theologian 
 Elly Blanksma-van den Heuvel (born 1959), politician and former bank manager, Mayor of Helmond since 2012
 Harry van Bommel (born 1962) a politician, anti-globalisation activist and former educator
 Diana van Berlo (born 1966), former member of disco/pop girl group Luv'
 Stochelo Rosenberg (born 1968) a Gypsy jazz guitarist who leads the Rosenberg Trio
 M. H. Benders (born 1971) a Dutch poet and philosopher

Sport 
 Willy van der Kuijlen (1946–2021) Dutch football player with 545 club caps
 Lisette Sevens (born 1949) field hockey player, team gold medallist at the 1984 Summer Olympics 
 René and Willy van de Kerkhof (born 1951), twins, former footballers with 491 & 511 club caps
 Fieke Boekhorst (born 1957) field hockey player, team gold medallist at the 1984 Summer Olympics 
 Berry van Aerle (born 1962) a Dutch retired footballer with 315 club caps
 Hans Gillhaus (born 1963) a Dutch retired footballer with 400 club caps
 Pieter Gruijters (born 1967) is a Paralympic athlete, 
 Wilfred Bouma (born 1978) a Dutch former footballer with 411 club caps
 Nieky Holzken (born 1983) a Dutch super middleweight kickboxer and professional boxer
 Bob de Voogd (born 1988) a Dutch field hockey player, team silver medallist at the 2012 Summer Olympics

Twin towns — sister cities

Helmond is twinned with:

Gallery

References

External links
Official Website  

 
Cities in the Netherlands
Municipalities of North Brabant
Populated places in North Brabant